The third season of the American television drama series Mistresses premiered on June 18, 2015, on ABC. The series is based on the UK series of the same name and was adapted by K. J. Steinberg, it stars Yunjin Kim, Rochelle Aytes, Jes Macallan and Jennifer Esposito as the four lead characters.

Cast

Main cast
 Yunjin Kim as Dr. Karen Kim
 Rochelle Aytes as April Malloy
 Jes Macallan as Josslyn "Joss" Carver
 Brett Tucker as Harry Davis
 Rob Mayes as Marc Nickleby
 Jennifer Esposito as Calista Raines

Recurring cast
 Corinne Massiah as Lucy Malloy
 Ed Quinn as Dr. Alec Adams
 Sonja Bennett as Vivian Adams
 Julius Fair as Scotty Nickleby
 Noam Jenkins as Luca Raines
 Jarod Joseph as Wilson Corvo
 Emmanuelle Vaugier as Niko
 Brian J. White as Blair Patterson
 Corey Sevier as David Hudson
 Carmel Amit as Ariella "Ari" Greenburg
 Christine Willes as Patty Deckler
 Kavan Smith as Ellis Boone
 Andrew Airlie as Father John
 Samantha Ferris as Detective Libby Whitehead
 Katie Messina as Roz

Guest stars
 Justin Hartley as Scott Trosman
 Kate Beahan as Miranda Nickleby
 Chloe Babcook as Eva Petrov
 Jason George as Dominic Taylor
 Jason Gerhardt as Zack Kilmer
 Rebeka Montoya as Antonia 'Toni' Ruiz
 Chrishell Stause as Yoga Woman
 Lynn Whitfield as Marjorie
 Ricky Whittle as Daniel Zamora
 Rocco DiSpirito as himself

Production
On September 30, 2014, ABC renewed Mistresses for a third season and Alyssa Milano left the series after two seasons in Los Angeles, California. Jennifer Esposito also stars as the new co-lead as Calista Raines, as a creative director of a luxury fashion brand. However, she left the series on September 25, 2015, after the third season.

Rob Mayes then joined the series as new series regular Marc, Miranda's brother who moves in with April. Ed Quinn has booked the recurring role of Dr. Alec Adams, an internist at the hospital, whose wife is going through medical issues. Emmanuelle Vaugier will recur throughout this season as Niko, a tough new mixologist at Wunderbar and a thorn in Joss' side. Brian J. White is set to recur this season as Blair, the headmaster of the school Lucy attends, who takes a liking to April. Chrishell Stause will also guest star in the fifth episode as a woman April meets during hot yoga.

Episodes

Ratings

References

External links
 
 

03
2015 American television seasons